This article provides an overview of the Austrian post-offices presence in Crete and the use of French currency on Austrian stamps in the Ottoman Empire.

Postal History 
Along with several other nations, the Austro-Hungarian Empire maintained its own post offices in Crete in the late 19th and early 20th centuries. The three post offices, in Chania, Heraklion and Rethymno, operated from 1890 until 1914, replacing earlier Austrian Lloyd postal agencies and official Austrian postal agencies which operated in turn in these towns starting in 1837 and 1845 respectively.

Stamp issues 
These offices used Austrian stamps denominated or surcharged in various currencies (Lombardy–Venetian soldi, Turkish paras and piastres, and French centimes and francs) or, much more rarely, used regular not surcharged Austrian stamps.

French currency issues
In order to better compete with the French post offices, regular Austrian stamps were overprinted in French currency in 1903 (values 5 Centimes to 4 Francs). The last set was in 1908–1914 in designs similar to the Austrian set commemorating the 60th anniversary of the Emperor's accession.

Many stamp collectors and catalogues have traditionally referred to just the French currency issues as "Austrian Post Offices in Crete", distinguishing them from the Turkish currency issues which have been referred to as "Austrian post offices in the Ottoman Empire" or as "Austrian Levant". However, stamps in both currencies were in use both in the offices in Crete and in many other Austrian post offices within the Ottoman Empire. Ferchenbauer explains that the reason is that it was not officially permitted to admit the competition outside Crete island.

See also
 Austrian post offices in the Ottoman Empire

References and sources
References

Sources
 Stanley Gibbons Stamp Catalogue - Part 2: Austria & Hungary, 6th Edition 2002, pp 148–152
 Rienk M. Feenstra & Friends, Crete: Postal History, Postage and Revenue Stamps, Coins & Banknotes (collectio, 2001)
 AskPhil – Glossary of Stamp Collecting Terms
 Encyclopaedia of Postal History
 Rossiter, Stuart & John Flower. The Stamp Atlas. London: Macdonald, 1986, p. 331. 

Ottoman Crete
Cretan State
Philately of Greece
Philately of Austria
1890 establishments in the Ottoman Empire